He Qiang is a retired professional wushu taolu athlete from China.

Career 
At the 1990 Asian Games, Qiang won the first gold medal for China in men's nanquan. Two years later, he became the world champion in nanquan at the 1993 World Wushu Championships. He then competed in the 1994 Asian Games and won once again in men's nanquan, becoming the second double gold-medalist at the Games alongside Yuan Wenqing.

Awards 
By the Chinese Wushu Association:

 : 100 Outstanding Martial Artists (1995)
 7th Duan Rank (2003)

See also 

 List of Asian Games medalists in wushu

References 

Chinese wushu practitioners
Wushu practitioners at the 1990 Asian Games
Wushu practitioners at the 1994 Asian Games
Living people
Asian Games gold medalists for China
Asian Games medalists in wushu
Medalists at the 1990 Asian Games
Medalists at the 1994 Asian Games
1970 births